Odiáxere is a closed halt on the Algarve line in the Lagos municipality, Portugal. It was opened on the 30th of July 1922, and closed in 2003. At the time, the halt had an average of 20 passengers per month.

References

Railway stations in Portugal
Railway stations opened in 1922
Railway stations closed in 2003